Kiell Smith-Bynoe is a British actor most notable for playing one of the leads in the BBC One sitcom Ghosts, and for his appearances in Stath Lets Flats, Man Like Mobeen and Enterprice.

Career
Smith-Bynoe trained in Joan Littlewood improvisation style as part of the junior group at Theatre Royal Stratford East and similarly as an adult at the East 15 Acting School. He is still part of improv comedy troupes such as "BATTLEACTS!" with whom he performed at festivals including the Edinburgh Festival. One of his early acting roles was in 2012 in the YouTube web series Diary of a Bad Man as a gangster called Klayze, and his first professional role was in the 2012 crime drama series Whitechapel. He was previously known for the novelty grime hit "Junior Spesh" under the name MC Klayze Flaymz.

Smith-Bynoe appeared on the 2021 BBC Christmas special of The Great British Sewing Bee.

On 6 May 2022 his Channel 4 Comedy Blap, Red Flag, was released.

Smith-Bynoe will be a cast member in the upcoming Series 15 of Taskmaster, scheduled to be broadcast in 2023.

Filmography

Television

References

External links 
 
 

1989 births
Living people
Alumni of East 15 Acting School
Black British male actors
Comedians from London
English male comedians
English male television actors
English male voice actors
English people of Barbadian descent
English people of Jamaican descent
People educated at St Bonaventure's Catholic School
People from the London Borough of Newham